The 29th Training Systems Squadron is an active United States Air Force unit. It is assigned to the 753d Test and Evaluation Group, at Eglin Air Force Base, Florida.

The squadron is one of the oldest in the United States Air Force, its origins dating to March 1918, being organized at Brooks Field, Texas, as a training squadron during World War I. The squadron saw combat during World War II, and became part of the Air Defense Command during the Cold War.

Overview

The 29th Training Systems Squadron has personnel located at Eglin Air Force Base, Florida and 11 geographically separated units around the nation: Barksdale Air Force Base, Louisiana; Beale Air Force Base, California; Creech Air Force Base, Nevada; Dyess Air Force Base, Texas; Hill Air Force Base, Utah; Offutt Air Force Base, Nebraska; Robins Air Force Base, Georgia; Tinker Air Force Base, Oklahoma; Tyndall Air Force Base, Florida and Whiteman Air Force Base, Missouri as well as an operating location in Mesa, Arizona.

The squadron serves as the combat air force's center of expertise for aircrew training devices. Squadron personnel provide technical expertise on all aspects of ATD life-cycle management, including acquisition, modification, acceptance testing and certification testing for all A-10, B-1, B-2, B-52, E-3, E-4, E-8, EC-130, F-15C/E, F-16, F-22, F-35, HH-60, HC-130, MQ-1/9, RC-135, RQ-4 and U-2 ATDs.

Unit personnel also manage the CAF simulator certification program. The squadron's efforts incorporate ATD oversight and management from concept development and preliminary design review through sustainment and program deactivation. By keeping training devices concurrent, cost effective and viable, the 29th guarantees training systems meet present and future warfighters' needs while supporting evolving training demands with modern technology.

History

World War I
The first predecessor of the squadron was the 29th Aero Squadron, which was organized at Camp Knox, Kentucky, in the fall of 1918, shortly before the end of World War I.  It was equipped with Curtiss JN-4 and Curtiss JN-6H aircraft, which it apparently operated from Camp Knox's airfield, Godman Field, as the aerial support unit for a field artillery brigade until it was demobilized in September 1919.

Panama Canal Zone

It was reactivated in the Panama Canal Zone at Albrook Field on 1 October 1933.  On 6 December 1939, it was redesignated as the 29th Pursuit Squadron (Interceptor) and, between 1933 and 1939, had operated, in series, the Boeing P-12, Boeing P-26A Peashooter and Curtiss P-36A Hawk.

After the Pearl Harbor Attack, the squadron had nine new Curtiss P-40E Warhawks, one of the first Canal Zone units to receive the new fighters, although at least one P-40C was also on hand.  The squadron was placed on general alert at 15:00, 7 December 1941, at which time all 10 P-40E's on hand were basically combat ready. Still at Albrook at the time, the unit later was the first to move to Calzada Larga Airfield, Panama (later named Madden Field). The unit was redesignated as the 29th Fighter Squadron on 15 May 1942.

On 29 August 1942, Flight "C" of the squadron was transferred from Madden to remote Talara Airport, Peru, to provide aerodrome defense for the installations there and was relieved there by "E" Flight by December (although this was redesignated as "0" Flight, 51st Fighter Squadron concurrently that month).  By January 1943, with the main body still at Madden Field with 18 aircraft, the unit was starting conversion to Bell P-39K Airacobras.  By October 1943, still at Madden Field, the squadron also had a flight detached to Aguadulce Army Airfield, Panama. Effective 1 November 1943, with the dissolution of the 16th Fighter Group, the squadron was subordinated directly to the XXVI Fighter Command.

Replacement training

The squadron continued on at Madden Field until 25 March 1944, when the unit moved to Lincoln Army Airfield, Nebraska, and being assigned to IV Fighter Command as a replacement training unit, flying predominantly Lockheed P-38 Lightnings.

The squadron was later assigned to California where it was assigned to perform testing of the Bell P-59 Airacomet and Lockheed P-80 Shooting Star jet aircraft based at Muroc Dry Lake (later Edwards Air Force Base). The early jets provided USAAF pilots and ground crews with valuable data about the difficulties and pitfalls involved in converting to jet aircraft. This information proved quite useful when more advanced jet fighters finally became available in quantity.   The squadron later moved to several other airfields in California providing transition training to new jet pilots until being inactivated in July 1946.

Air Defense Command

It was reactivated in 1953 as part of Air Defense Command as an air defense squadron, and equipped with Lockheed F-94C Starfire day interceptors. It was assigned to Great Falls AFB, Montana with a mission for the air defense of the Upper Midwest region. It was re-equipped in 1957 with Northrop F-89H Scorpion Interceptor and later with the F-89J.

It received the new McDonnell F-101B Voodoo supersonic interceptor, and the F-101F operational and conversion trainer in 1960. The two-seat trainer version was equipped with dual controls, but carried the same armament as the F-101B and were fully combat-capable.  On 22 October 1962, before President John F. Kennedy told Americans that missiles were in place in Cuba, the squadron dispersed one third of its force, equipped with nuclear tipped missiles to Billings Logan Field at the start of the Cuban Missile Crisis. These planes returned to Malmstrom after the crisis.

It was inactivated in July 1968 as part of the drawdown of ADC interceptor bases, and the aircraft were passed along to the Air National Guard.

Lineage
 29th Aero Squadron
 Organized as the 29th Aero Squadron on 10 October 1918
 Demobilized 12 September 1919
 Reconstituted on 5 March 1935 and consolidated with the 29th Pursuit Squadron as the 29th Pursuit Squadron

 29th Training Systems Squadron
 Constituted as the 29th Pursuit Squadron on 23 March 1924
 Activated on 1 October 1933
 Consolidated with the 29th Aero Squadron on 5 March 1935
 Redesignated 29th Pursuit Squadron (Interceptor) on 6 December 1939
 Redesignated 29th Fighter Squadron on 15 May 1942
 Redesignated 29th Fighter Squadron (Single Engine) by 1943
 Redesignated 29th Fighter Squadron, Single Engine on 20 August 1943
 Inactivated on 25 May 1944
 Activated on 21 July 1944
 Redesignated 29th Fighter Squadron, Jet Propelled on 18 January 1946
 Inactivated on 3 July 1946
 Redesignated 29th Fighter-Interceptor Squadron on 23 March 1953
 Activated on 8 November 1953
 Discontinued and inactivated on 18 July 1968
 Redesignated 29th Training Systems Squadron on 9 April 1993
 Activated on 15 April 1993

Assignments
 Post Headquarters, Brooks Field, 1918–1919
 16th Pursuit Group (later Fighter Group), 1 October 1933
 XXVI Fighter Command, 1 November 1943
 Second Air Force, 8 April 1944 – 25 May 1944
 412th Fighter Group, 21 July 1944 – 3 July 1946
 29th Air Division, 8 November 1953
 Great Falls Air Defense Sector, 1 July 1960 – 1 July 1968
 79th Test and Evaluation Group (later 53rd Test and Evaluation Group), 15 April 1993
 53rd Test Management Group, 1 October 2002
 753rd Test and Evaluation Group, 1 October 2021 – present

Stations

 Camp Knox (later Godman Field), Kentucky, 10 October 1918 – 12 September 1919
 Albrook Field, Panama Canal Zone, 1 October 1933
 Casa Larga Airfield, Panama, 17 May 1942 – 25 March 1944
 Lincoln Army Air Field, Nebraska, 8 April – 25 May 1944
 Palmdale Army Air Field, California, 21 July 1944

 Bakersfield Municipal Airport, California, 5 August 1944
 Oxnard Flight Strip, California, 9 September 1944
 Santa Maria Army Air Field, California, 10 July 1945
 March Field, California, 6 December 1945 – 3 July 1946
 Great Falls Air Force Base (later Malmstrom Air Force Base), Montana, 8 November 1953 – 1 July 1968
 Eglin Air Force Base, Florida, 15 April 1993 – present

Aircraft

 Curtiss JN-4, 1918–1919
 Curtiss JN-6H, 1918–1919
 Boeing P-12, 1933–1939
 Boeing P-26 Peashooter, 1933–1939
 Curtiss P-36 Hawk, 1939–1941
 Curtiss P-40 Warhawk, 1941–1944
 Bell P-39 Airacobra, 1942–1944
 North American A-36 Apache, 1944
 Bell P-63 Kingcobra, 1944
 Douglas A-24 Banshee, 1944–1945
 Lockheed P-38 Lightning, 1944–1945
 Bell P-59 Airacomet, 1944–1945
 North American P-51 Mustang, 1945–1946
 Lockheed P-80 Shooting Star, 1945–1946.
 Lockheed F-94C Starfire, 1953–1957
 Northrop F-89H Scorpion, 1957–1958
 Northrop F-89J Scorpion, 1958–1960
 McDonnell F-101B Voodoo, 1960–1968

See also

 List of American aero squadrons

References

Notes
 Explanatory notes

 Citations

Bibliography

 
 
 
 
 McMullen, Richard F. (1964) "The Fighter Interceptor Force 1962–1964"  ADC Historical Study No. 27, Air Defense Command, Ent Air Force Base, CO (Confidential, declassified 22 March 2000)
 
 NORAD/CONAD Participation in the Cuban Missile Crisis, Historical Reference Paper No. 8, Directorate of Command History Continental Air Defense Command, Ent AFB, CO, 1 February 1963 (Top Secret NOFORN declassified 9 March 1996).

External links
 AFHRA Document 01106135 29th Fighter Squadron, 1939–1943
 AFHRA Document 00002497 History of Madden Field, Panama
 AFHRA Document 00056116 29th Fighter Squadron, 1945

0029